Kevin Hamilton is a Canadian diplomat who was Ambassador to Romania, Bulgaria, and Moldova, with residence in Bucharest, from 2016 to 2020.
 
A career member of the Canadian foreign service, he joined the Department of Foreign Affairs and International Trade in 1999. From 2013 to 2016 he was director of the Eastern Europe and Eurasia Division, responsible for Canada's political and trade relations with 19 European and Eurasian countries from the Western Balkans to Central Asia. From 2010 to 2013, Hamilton served as head of office in Lithuania, with concurrent accreditation in Estonia and Latvia. Prior to his appointment in Vilnius, he was head of the political section at the High Commission in the United Kingdom, serving as counsellor from 2007 to 2010. Before his posting in London, he was deputy director of the Conflict Prevention and Peacebuilding Group at Headquarters and from 2003 to 2006 was deputy director of the Policy Planning Staff, where he served concurrently as international security analyst and as chief advisor to Canada's G8 political director. While at Headquarters, Hamilton also served in the Office of the Special Ambassador for Mine Action, the Non-proliferation and Disarmament Division, and the Western Balkans Directorate. Overseas, he has also served at Canada's embassies in Tel Aviv and Sarajevo.

He holds an M.A. in International Affairs from the Norman Paterson School of International Affairs, Carleton University (Ottawa), and a B.A. in International Relations from the University of British Columbia (Vancouver).

References 

Canadian diplomats
Carleton University alumni
Living people
People from Duncan, British Columbia
University of British Columbia alumni
Year of birth missing (living people)
Ambassadors of Canada to Romania
Ambassadors of Canada to Bulgaria
Ambassadors of Canada to Moldova